Colus griseus is a species of sea snail, a marine gastropod mollusc in the family Colidae, the true whelks and the like. It was first discovered in 1889.

Distribution
This marine species occurs in the Indo-Pacific.

References

External links
 Dall, W. H. (1890). Scientific results of explorations by the U. S. Fish Commission Steamer “Albatross”. No. VII. Preliminary report on the collection of Mollusca and Brachiopoda obtained in 1887–'88. Proceedings of the United States National Museum. 12 (773): 219-362, pls 5-14

Colidae
Gastropods described in 1889